"You're the Last Thing I Needed Tonight" is a song written by Don Pfrimmer and David Wills, and recorded by actor and American country music artist John Schneider.  It was released in April 1986 as the second from the album A Memory Like You.  The song was Schneider's fourth and last number one on the country chart.  The single went to number one for one week and spent a total of fifteen weeks on the country chart.

Chart performance

References

1986 singles
John Schneider (screen actor) songs
Songs written by David Wills (singer)
Song recordings produced by Jimmy Bowen
MCA Records singles
Songs written by Don Pfrimmer
1985 songs